Thomas Causey (born December 5, 1949) is an American sound engineer. He was nominated for an Academy Award in the category Best Sound for the film Dick Tracy.

Selected filmography
 Dick Tracy (1990)

References

External links
 

1949 births
Living people
American audio engineers
People from New Orleans